Volta is a lunar impact crater near the northwest limb of the Moon. It is located south-southeast of the crater Xenophanes, and due north of the smaller Galvani. The crater Regnault lies across the western rim of Volta. Attached to the southwest rim of Volta and the southern rim of Regnault is Stokes. Lying between Volta and Stokes in the north, and Galvani in the south, is the worn Langley.

The outer rim of Volta is heavily worn and irregular, with small craters overlying the rim crest, with Volta K and Volta J along the south side, a chain of craters along the east, and Regnault along the west rim. Even the northern rim is irregular, with a gouging valley extending through the north-northeast rim towards Xenophanes. In contrast the interior floor is relatively level and flat, with only a few small craters in the surface. The most notable of these are Volta D in the southeast and Volta B to the northeast.

Satellite craters
By convention these features are identified on lunar maps by placing the letter on the side of the crater midpoint that is closest to Volta.

References

 
 
 
 
 
 
 
 
 
 
 
 

Impact craters on the Moon
Alessandro Volta